The Monroe County Community School Corporation (MCCSC) is a school corporation providing primary, secondary and adult educational services in Monroe County, Indiana.  MCCSC constitutes a unified school district and has tax and legislative authority under Indiana law within its district (all of Monroe County excepting Richland and Bean Blossom Townships, which are under the authority of the Richland-Bean Blossom Community School Corporation).

MCCSC operates fourteen elementary schools, three middle schools, four high schools and one vocational school.  In addition, they offer several adult and alternative education facilities.

MCCSC is governed by a board of seven trustees elected to staggered four-year terms on a subdistrict basis within the school district.  The board of trustees then hires a superintendent, who oversees the day-to-day administration and operation of the school district.

The school district has significant relationships with Indiana University.

Elementary schools
Arlington Heights Elementary School
Binford Elementary School
Childs Elementary School
Clear Creek Elementary School
Fairview Elementary - An Artful Learning and Performing Arts Academy
Grandview Elementary School
Highland Park Elementary School
Lakeview Elementary School
Marlin Elementary School
Rogers Elementary School
Summit Elementary School
Templeton Elementary School
Unionville Elementary School
University Elementary School

Middle schools
Batchelor Middle School (Bulldogs)
Jackson Creek Middle School (Jaguars)
Tri-North Middle School  (Trojans)

High schools
Bloomington High School North (Cougars)
Bloomington High School South (Panthers)
Bloomington Graduation School
The Academy of Science and Entrepreneurship

Career and Technical(Vocational) School
Hoosier Hills Career Center

Adult Education
MCCSC Adult Education

External links
 Official Site

School districts in Indiana
Education in Monroe County, Indiana